Gloria Townsend is an American computer scientist and professor in the department of Computer Science at DePauw University in Indiana. She is known for her work in evolutionary computation and her involvement with women in computing.  She has served on the executive committee of the Association for Computing Machinery (ACM) Council on Women in Computing. She is the author of One Hundred One Ideas for Small Regional Celebrations of Women in Computing.  In 2013, she received the Mr. and Mrs. Fred C. Tucker Jr. Distinguished Career Award for notable contributions to DePauw through her commitments to students, teaching excellence, their chosen disciplines, and service to the university.

In 2006, she organized several new regional celebrations of Women in Computing (WiC) to coincide with the international Grace Hopper Celebration of Women in Computing conference. In 2010, the United States National Science Foundation awarded funding to extend the celebrations to cover 12 regions as a joint effort by ACM-W, ABI, and NCWIT.,

Publications
 1998. Turning liabilities into assets in a general education course, SIGCSE '98 Proceedings of the twenty-ninth SIGCSE technical symposium on Computer science education, Pages 58–62, ACM New York, NY, USA, 1998.
 2002. People who make a difference: mentors and role models, ACM SIGCSE Bulletin - Women and Computing Homepage archive, Volume 34 Issue 2, Pages 57–61, ACM New York, NY, USA, June 2002.
 2007. Leveling the CS1 playing field, SIGCSE '07 Proceedings of the 38th SIGCSE technical symposium on Computer science education, Pages 331–335, ACM New York, NY, USA, 2007.

See also
Association for Computing Machinery's Council on Women in Computing (ACM-W)

References

External links
 Gloria Townsend Professor of Computer Science, DePauw
 ACM-W Profile
 Grace Hopper Celebration of Women in Computing

21st-century American women scientists
DePauw University faculty
Indiana University alumni
Living people
American women computer scientists
American computer scientists
Year of birth missing (living people)
American women academics